Thomas Muster was the defending champion and won in the final 6–2, 6–2, 6–4 against Yevgeny Kafelnikov.

Seeds
A champion seed is indicated in bold text while text in italics indicates the round in which that seed was eliminated. All sixteen seeds received a bye to the second round.

  Thomas Muster (champion)
  Yevgeny Kafelnikov (final)
  Marcelo Ríos (second round)
  Stefan Edberg (third round)
  Carlos Moyá (third round)
  Alberto Berasategui (semifinals)
  Félix Mantilla (quarterfinals)
  Francisco Clavet (quarterfinals)
  Bernd Karbacher (second round)
  Magnus Gustafsson (third round)
  Bohdan Ulihrach (third round)
  Àlex Corretja (semifinals)
  Andriy Medvedev (second round)
  Hernán Gumy (second round)
  Jiří Novák (second round)
  Mikael Tillström (third round)

Draw

Finals

Top half

Section 1

Section 2

Bottom half

Section 3

Section 4

References

Singles 1996
Mercedes Cup Singles